Sir Louis Victor Delafaye was chief judge of the Supreme Court of the Colony of Mauritius. He was knighted in 1901.

References 

Year of birth missing
Year of death missing
Knights Bachelor
British Mauritius judges